Franco Urru (died November 29, 2012) was an Italian comic artist best known in the United States for his work on Spike: Asylum, Spike: Shadow Puppets and Angel: After The Fall for IDW Publishing.

He was the main artist for the first five issues of Angel: After The Fall, a canonical continuation of the Angel television series. 

He died on November 29, 2012.

References

Italian comics artists
Year of birth missing
 2012 deaths